Sūdan (1700–1753) was the main court poet of Maharaja Suraj Mal, the Bharatpur ruler in Rajasthan. He was Mathur by caste, resident of Mathura and the most favourite poet of the Bharatpur Maharaja Suraj Mal. He had accompanied the Maharaja during all important wars and has written historical account in the book named Sujān Charitra.

See also
Braj Bhasha
Bharatpur

References

Indian male poets
Hindi-language poets
Poets from Rajasthan
History of Bharatpur, Rajasthan
18th-century Indian poets
18th-century male writers